Debra Richtmeyer is an American classical saxophonist born June 19, 1957, in Lansing, Michigan.

Richtmeyer earned her B.M.E. and M.M. at Northwestern University, where she studied with Frederick L. Hemke. She is Professor of Saxophone at the University of Illinois at Urbana-Champaign where she has served since 1991.  Prior to her appointment at the University of Illinois, she served as saxophone professor at the University of North Texas College of Music from 1981 to 1991 and at the Lawrence University Conservatory of Music from 1980 to 1981.

Richtmeyer is an Honorary Life Member and past president of the North American Saxophone Alliance. In 1997 she became the first woman to perform as a concerto soloist with orchestra at a World Saxophone Congress, and in 2009 the first woman to teach a master class at the congress. Richtmeyer is a Selmer Paris saxophone artist.

A renowned pedagogue, Richtmeyer received the University of Illinois 2002 Campus Award for Excellence in Graduate and Professional Teaching and the University of Illinois College of Fine and Applied Arts 1997 Faculty Excellence in Teaching Award. She has adjudicated national and international competitions, including the Fischoff National Chamber Music Competition, the North American Saxophone Alliance National Solo Competition and the Jean-Marie Londeix International Saxophone Competition held in Bangkok, Thailand. Her students have won national and international prizes and perform and teach throughout the United States and in Europe and Asia.

Richtmeyer was saxophonist with the Dallas Symphony Orchestra in performances and recordings from 1981 to 1991 and has performed with ensembles such as the St. Louis Symphony Orchestra, the U.S. Navy Band, the Indianapolis Chamber Symphony, the Scottish Chamber Orchestra, the Slovak Radio Orchestra and the Zlin Philharmonic. She has performed as soloist and given master classes throughout North America and Europe and in Thailand and China.  She has had numerous compositions written for her.

Partial discography
Light of Sothis, Mark Records. Works by Tom Bourcier, Scott Wyatt, Cindy McTee, Paul Martin Zonn, Steven Everett, and Amy Quate
 Extravaganza for Saxophone and Orchestra, Albany Records. Works by David Ott, Richard Strauss, Sergei Rachmaninoff, and Alexander Glazunov
World Without Words: Debra Richtmeyer and the University of Illinois 2008–2009 Saxophone Studio, Mark Records.  Works by Hilary Tann, Keith Murphy, Erik Lund, Ed Martin, Dieter Mack, Henning Schröder, James Bunch, Stephen Andrew Taylor
Saxophone Concerto, Navona Records. Works by Lee Actor

Notable students

Kenneth Tse, Professor of Saxophone at the University of Iowa
Keitaro Harada, Opera and Orchestra Conductor
Michael Holmes, Artist-Teacher of Saxophone and Head of Woodwinds at Roosevelt University Chicago College of Performing Arts and Director of Marketing for the North American Saxophone Alliance
Vanessa Sielert (saxophonist), Associate Professor of Saxophone, Associate Director University of Idaho Lionel Hampton School of Music
Brad Leali, Professor of Saxophone, University of North Texas
Dr. Jackie Lamar, Saxophone Professor at University of Central Arkansas,

References

Classical saxophonists
American classical saxophonists
Contemporary classical music performers
Bienen School of Music alumni
University of Illinois faculty
Lawrence University faculty
University of North Texas College of Music faculty
Women saxophonists
Living people
1957 births
21st-century saxophonists